Eloquence (also known as Eloquence: Complete Works) is a solo album by German electronic musician and ex-Kraftwerk member Wolfgang Flür. It was announced by Cherry Red Records on 1 October 2015 and released on 16 October 2015. An expanded re-release of the album, titled Eloquence Expanded, was announced on 29 February 2020, with a 100 copy limited edition signed release before its full release on 6 April 2020.

Track listing

References

External links
Eloquence on Discogs

2015 albums